Microgravity is the debut studio album by Norwegian electronic musician Geir Jenssen under the stage name Biosphere, released in 1991.

The album was at first rejected by SSR, the subsidiary of Nettwerk with whom Jenssen had previously released his music, as "unmarketable". The small Norwegian label Origo Sound picked it up, and the record scored on the club circuit in 1991.

At the end of 2014, Geir Jenssen launched a successful Kickstarter campaign to re-release the album on vinyl.

Track listing

Personnel
Geir Jenssen – production, writing
Alexander Stojanovic – editing

References

1991 debut albums
Biosphere (musician) albums
Ambient house albums